Season 11 of the Revolution track series is being competed from October 2013 to March 2014, across a range of venues; the National Cycling Centre in Manchester, the Sir Chris Hoy Velodrome in Glasgow and finally the Olympic Velodrome in London and will consist of 5 rounds.

Rounds

Championship Standings
After round 4 of 5

Round 1

Flying Lap

Elimination Race

Points Race

1km Madison TT

Scratch Race

Round 2

Flying Lap

Elimination Race

Points Race

1km Madison TT

Scratch Race

Round 3

Flying Lap

Team Elimination Race

Points Race

1km Madison TT

Scratch Race

Round 4

Flying Lap

Elimination Race

Points Race

1km Madison TT

Scratch Race

References

Revolution (cycling series)
2013 in British sport
2014 in British sport
2013 in track cycling
2014 in track cycling